Johannes Linnankoski (originally Vihtori Johan Peltonen, 18 October 1869 – 10 August 1913) was a Finnish author and playwright, which mainly influenced writing in the Golden Age of Finnish Art. His most famous work is the romance novel, The Song of the Blood-Red Flower (1905). His primary themes were guilt, punishment, and redemption as moral questions.

Life

Linnankoski was born in Vakkola, Askola and was active in the cultural life of Eastern Uusimaa. He was one of the founders of the bank in Porvoo and also founded Finnish-language schools and daily newspapers such as Uusimaa, the first Finnish-language newspaper situated outside of the major towns of Uusimaa.

Linnankoski married Ester Drugg in 1899 and they had four children: Marjatta, Salama, Touko and Urmas. All his children were born under the surname Peltonen.

In his last years he moved from Askola to the Helsinki Deaconess Institute, in Helsinki, for treatment of his poor health, and died there of anemia at the age of 43 in 1913.

In 1938 a Linnankoski Museum was opened near the sauna building where Linnankoski was supposedly born.

Film adaptations
His books have been made into numerous major feature films with the most famous and notorious being The Milkmaid (directed by T. J. Särkkä) and Laulu tulipunaisesta kukasta (directed by Mikko Niskanen). The Song of the Blood-Red Flower has also been filmed in Sweden, in three different versions by directors Mauritz Stiller, Per-Axel Branner and Gustaf Molander.

Bibliography
 The Song of the Blood-Red Flower (Laulu tulipunaisesta kukasta, 1905)
 The Fugitives (Pakolaiset, 1908)
 Kootut teokset

References

External links
 
 
 

1869 births
1913 deaths
People from Askola
People from Uusimaa Province (Grand Duchy of Finland)
Fennomans
Finnish writers
Finnish-language writers